Garah Zu (also Romanized as Garah Zū. Garehzow, and Garazū) is a village in Ziarat Rural District, in the Central District of Shirvan County, North Khorasan Province, Iran. At the 2006 census, its population was 258, in 72 families.

References 

Populated places in Shirvan County